Nakatu may refer to:
 Nakatu, Estonia
 Nakatu, Iran